Molly Rebecca Silfen is an American lawyer who is a nominee to serve as a judge of the United States Court of Federal Claims.

Education 

Silfen received a Bachelor of Science from Yale University in 2002 and a Juris Doctor from Harvard Law School in 2006. She taught a class on practice before the Federal Circuit at George Mason Law School.

Career 

She  served as a law clerk to Judge Alan David Lourie of the United States Court of Appeals for the Federal Circuit from 2008 to 2010. From 2006 to 2008 and again from 2010 to 2013, she was an associate at Finnegan, Henderson, Farabow, Garrett & Dunner LLP. She previously served as an appellate attorney in the appellate section of the Civil Division at the United States Department of Justice from 2015 to 2016. Since 2013, she has served as an associate solicitor in the United States Patent and Trademark Office. From 2021 to January 2023, she was detailed to serve as a counsel on the Intellectual Property Subcommittee of the United States Senate Committee on the Judiciary. Silfen serves as chair of the PTO committee for the Federal Circuit Bar Association and works on voter protection in her spare time.

Nomination to claims court 

On February 22, 2023, President Joe Biden announced his intent to nominate Silfen to serve as a of the United States Court of Federal Claims. On February 27, 2023, her nomination was sent to the Senate. President Biden nominated Silfen to the seat vacated by Judge Susan G. Braden, who assumed senior status on July 13, 2018. Her nomination is pending before the Senate Judiciary Committee.

References 

Living people
Year of birth missing (living people)
Place of birth missing (living people)
21st-century American lawyers
21st-century American women lawyers
Harvard Law School alumni
United States Department of Justice lawyers
United States Senate lawyers
Yale University alumni